Enrique de Villalobos Xeres (died 1554) was a Roman Catholic prelate who served as Bishop of Squillace (1540–1554) and Bishop of Lucera (1538–1540).

Biography
On 29 July 1538, Enrique de Villalobos Xeres was appointed Bishop of Lucera by Pope Paul III.

On 5 November 1540, he was appointed during the papacy of Pope Paul III as Bishop of Squillace.
He served as Bishop of Squillace until his death in 1554.

References

External links and additional sources
 (for Chronology of Bishops)  
 (for Chronology of Bishops)  
 (for Chronology of Bishops) 
 (for Chronology of Bishops) 

16th-century Italian Roman Catholic bishops
Bishops appointed by Pope Paul III
1554 deaths